FC Viljandi was an Estonian football club from the town of Viljandi, that played in the Estonian Meistriliiga in 2011 and 2012.

History
The club was created in early 2011, after Viljandi JK Tulevik decided to rebuild the squad with local amateur players and dropped down two levels to play in second league. As that left a gap in Meistriliiga, it was filled with a temporary club FC Viljandi, which was mostly composed by the same players that previously played for Tulevik.

The club was withdrawn from the championship after the 2012 season, when Tulevik won promotion to Esiliiga, the second highest division of Estonia.

FC Viljandi in Estonian football

Managers
 2011–2012:  Zaur Tšilingarašvili

References

External links
Team at Estonian Football Association

Viljandi
2011 establishments in Estonia
Viljandi
2012 disestablishments in Estonia